Penny Cooper (born April 7, 1969) is a former Canadian Olympic field hockey player who was inducted into the University of British Columbia (UBC) sports hall of fame in 2013.

She competed at the 1988 Summer Olympics in Seoul, South Korea, alongside fellow UBC Sports Hall of Fame member Melanie Slade, where Canada finished in sixth place.

In 1988, she was also awarded the Harry Jerome Comeback Award for recovering from an unusual setback for injuries. Cooper made a remarkable recovery from a disabling ligament injury that threatened to eliminate her from athleticism.

While concurrently competing with the Women’s National Team, Cooper also led the UBC team to “great success” from 1987 to 1992, including a Canadian Interuniversity Sport Championship in 1990, her graduating year.

She was named a Canada West All-Star in all but her first year; a second-team All Canadian in 1988; a first-team All Canadian in 1989 and 1990, and was voted to the Canadian Interuniversity Sport Championship All-Tournament Team in 1990. Copper was also awarded UBC's Kay Brearley Award for service to women's athletics in 1992.

References

External links 
 Inductee – Penny Cooper, UBC Sports Hall of Fame
 Penny Cooper – Olympic.ca Athlete Profile

1969 births
Living people
Canadian female field hockey players
Field hockey players at the 1988 Summer Olympics
Olympic field hockey players of Canada
Field hockey players from Vancouver
University of British Columbia alumni
University of Melbourne alumni
University of Melbourne women